Gordon Zeigler (September 14, 1899 – January 2, 1948) was an American baseball pitcher in the Negro leagues. He played with the Detroit Stars in 1921. In some sources, he is listed as William "Doc" Ziegler.

References

External links
 and Seamheads

Detroit Stars players
1899 births
1948 deaths
Baseball players from Alabama
People from Chilton County, Alabama
Baseball pitchers
20th-century African-American sportspeople